Trapiche de Abra is a town in the municipality of San Martín de Hidalgo in the state of Jalisco, Mexico. It has a population of 1,115 inhabitants, 522 men, 592 women.

References

External links
Trapiche del Abra at PueblosAmerica.com

Populated places in Jalisco